Death Pop Romance is the Danish band Raunchy's third album, released in 2006. It is their first with the vocalist Kasper Thomsen, who replaced Lars Vognstrup after Raunchy's 2004 album Confusion Bay.

Track list
 "This Legend Forever" – 4:24
 "Abandon Your Hope" – 4:43
 "Phantoms" – 5:01
 "The Curse of Bravery" – 4:20
 "Remembrance" – 5:21
 "Live the Myth" – 5:36
 "City of Hurt" – 5:02
 "Persistence" – 4:22
 "The Velvet Remains" – 4:16
 "Farewell to Devotion" – 5:29

Videography

References 

2006 albums
Raunchy (band) albums